Hylettus ramea is a species of longhorn beetles of the subfamily Lamiinae. It was described by Henry Walter Bates in 1864, and is known from central Brazil and French Guiana.

References

Beetles described in 1864
Beetles of South America
Hylettus